The League Algiers Football Association, also called League Algiers Football or League of Algiers was an organization of soccer in Algeria to the French colonial era. Founded in 1920 in order to develop the  colonial football  to Algiers; She paused for a moment due to World War II, then resumed in 1946. Eventually it will cease all activities in 1962 after the end of the War of Algeria who devoted the independence of the Algeria and which led to the mass exodus of settlers to France signifier abandonment of sports clubs run by the "settlers" and their structures.

Affiliated to the French Football Federation with four other leagues in North Africa that are leagues: the Constantine of Oran of Tunisia and Morocco; League Algiers so possessed as his four sisters the status of "league" or "Championship" amateur, and had four divisions that corresponded to the seventh, sixth, fifth and fourth division of French football.

These leagues so were the main football regions in North Africa from cutting the French colonial administration. They were very structured and very hierarchical and organized competitions for all age categories in addition to a so-called "corporate" (or category Championship "corporate" or company), the highest level was called Division of Honor .

History

Champions of Honor Division (DH) of the League Algiers 
 DH Championship League Algiers Centre Football Association (LAFA)

Titles by club

See also 
 Forconi Cup
 Coupe de France

References

External links 

 
Football leagues in Algeria
Alg
Defunct organisations based in Algeria